Mount Neva is a summit in Elko County, Nevada, in the United States.

References

Neva
Neva